Trachyzulpha is a genus of bush crickets in the subfamily Phaneropterinae, found in China, Indochina and Malaysia. It the only genus in the subtribe Trachyzulphina Gorochov, 2014, which was previously placed in the tribe "Tylopsini" (now the monotypic tribe Tylopsidini).

Species
The Orthoptera Species File lists:
 Trachyzulpha annulifera Carl, 1914
 Trachyzulpha bhutanica Gorochov, 2014
 Trachyzulpha formosana Shiraki, 1930
 Trachyzulpha fruhstorferi Dohrn, 1892 - type species
 Trachyzulpha siamica Gorochov, 2014
 Trachyzulpha sinuosa Liu, 2014

References

External links
 
 

Tettigoniidae genera
Phaneropterinae
Orthoptera of Asia